Decadence: The Meaninglessness of Modern Life is a six-part television documentary series commissioned by SBS Independent and produced by Fork Films. The series is hosted by Pria Viswalingam, who is best known for his work on the travel show A Fork in the Road. Decadence was originally broadcast on the Special Broadcasting Service (SBS) of Australia in 2006 in the form of six, thirty-minute-long episodes (including advertisements). It was re-screened again in 2007 as part of the SBS season on globalisation.

The series examined the decadence and meaninglessness of modern, western life. It is also posed the question: 'If we live in such a great and prosperous world, and we are living longer, better, and healthier than before, why are we so unhappy?' There were interviews with prominent experts and leaders in their fields throughout the series including John Tirman, Cardinal George Pell, Avner Offer, Susan Greenfield, Phillip Knightley, Kishore Mahbubani, Noam Chomsky, and John Spong.

Episode guide

Episode One: Money
Part one examined the growing greed of society and the 1980s ideal that greed is good. It also looked at the growing disparity between rich and poor.

Featured interviews
Petrea King, the founder of the Quest for Life Centre
Richard Eckersley, a social analyst at the Australian National University
The Honourable Jeff Kennett , the founding Chairman of beyondblue
Dr Clive Hamilton  , a public intellectual and founder and former executive director of the Australia Institute
Ian Kiernan , the founder of the Clean Up the World movement

Episode Two: Sex
Viswalingam interviewed New South Wales Police Commissioner Ken Moroney about the extent to which many cases of rape have become particularly violent and gruesome, and asked why sex crimes are growing in number. The link between violent pornography and sex crimes was also examined in this episode. A medical ethicist Dr. Amin Abboud noted that sex had been trivialized and needed to be placed back into the context of emotional connections and intimacy, and that sex should be rediscovered as part of love. In an interview, Orthodox Rabbi Shmuley Boteach, author of Kosher Sex, stated that modern relationships collapse when people lose interest in the sex, and that sex has become the sole measure and importance in a relationship.

Episode Three: Democracy
The nature of modern democracy was examined in this episode and the question was asked, 'Do we really live in a democratic world any more?' The erosion of democracy, media control and the use of public money for advertising was reviewed.

Featured interviews
Robert Manne, a leading Australian public intellectual and former editor of Quadrant
Major-General Michael Jeffery , a former Governor General of Australia
Professor Marian Sawer

Episode Four: Education
The continuing undervaluing of an education in western society was considered. The lack of government funding for primary and secondary education was reviewed. There was discussion about the transformation of universities from great learning places into businesses competing for students' money, who only want a fast-tracked easy course into a high-paying career.

Featured interviews
John Marsden, an author and educator
Professor Paul Davies , an English physicist, writer and broadcaster

Episode Five: Family
The modern western family was discussed, as is what really is a family in the west. The gradual decline in the importance placed on families and the disintegration of the idea of a family and people preferring isolation was reviewed.

Featured interviews
Alastair Nicholson , a former Chief Justice of the Family Court
Richard Eckersley
Dan Phillips, an executive of the Macquarie Group
Rabbi Shmuley Boteach, author of Kosher Sex

Episode Six: God
The nature of religion and religion in western society was reviewed. The growing number of irreligious people in Western countries was considered and it was asked whether this had any effect on our happiness or morals.

Featured interviews
The Most Reverend Peter Jensen, a former Anglican Archbishop of Sydney
His Eminence George Cardinal Pell , a former Catholic Archbishop of Sydney
Dr Simon Longstaff, the founder of the St James Ethics Centre
Pastor Brian Houston, a leader of the Hillsong Church
Dr Muriel Porter , an author and journalist

See also

 Consumerism
 Anti-consumerism
 List of Australian television series

References

External links
Official Website
Fork Films

2000s Australian documentary television series
Special Broadcasting Service original programming
2006 Australian television series debuts
2007 Australian television series endings
Documentary films about consumerism
Documentary films about globalization
Criticism of capitalism